Richard Christopher Michael Wijtenburg-Smith (born 28 September 1987) is an English field hockey player who plays as a defender for Dutch club Klein Zwitserland.

Smith made his international debut in 2009. He competed for Great Britain at the 2012 Summer Olympics. He also won gold at the 2009 EuroHockey Championship with England.

Club career
He has played club hockey for Hampstead & Westminster, Loughborough, Guildford and City of Portsmouth, as well as for Royal Racing Club in Belgium. On 16 June 2020, it was announced he joined Klein Zwitserland in The Hague for the 2020–21 season as he moved to the Netherlands.

References

External links
 

1987 births
Living people
Sportspeople from Portsmouth
English male field hockey players
Male field hockey defenders
2010 Men's Hockey World Cup players
Field hockey players at the 2010 Commonwealth Games
Field hockey players at the 2012 Summer Olympics
Olympic field hockey players of Great Britain
British male field hockey players
Alumni of Loughborough University
Loughborough Students field hockey players
Hampstead & Westminster Hockey Club players
Guildford Hockey Club players
Men's England Hockey League players
Men's Belgian Hockey League players
Men's Hoofdklasse Hockey players
HC Klein Zwitserland players
Commonwealth Games competitors for England